Philip Doddridge McCulloch Jr. (June 23, 1851 – November 26, 1928) was a U.S. Representative from Arkansas.

Born in Murfreesboro, Tennessee, McCulloch moved with his parents to Trenton, Tennessee, where he attended private schools and Andrew College. McCulloch studied law and was admitted to the bar in 1872, after which he began a law practice in Trenton. In February, 1874, McCulloch moved to Marianna, Arkansas, where he continued the practice of law.

McCulloch was elected prosecuting attorney for the first judicial district in 1878, and was reelected for three successive terms, serving until 1884. He served as chairman of the Democratic central committee of Lee County, Arkansas from 1875 to 1893.

McCulloch was elected mayor of Marianna, Arkansas, in 1875, but declined to serve. He served as member of the board of education and as a delegate to the Democratic State convention in 1890.

McCulloch was elected as a Democrat to the Fifty-third and to the four succeeding Congresses (March 4, 1893 – March 3, 1903), after which he declined to be a candidate for renomination. Instead he resumed the practice of law in Marianna, Arkansas, where he died on November 26, 1928. McCulloch was interred in Cedar Heights Cemetery.

References

1851 births
1928 deaths
Democratic Party members of the United States House of Representatives from Arkansas
People from Murfreesboro, Tennessee
People from Trenton, Tennessee
People from Marianna, Arkansas